Harold Dennis "Chick" Gagnon (September 27, 1897 – April 30, 1970) was a shortstop in Major League Baseball. He played for the Detroit Tigers and Washington Senators.

References

External links

1897 births
1970 deaths
Major League Baseball shortstops
Detroit Tigers players
Washington Senators (1901–1960) players
Baseball players from Massachusetts